Capital Development Authority (abbreviated as CDA), is a public benefit corporation responsible for providing municipal services in Islamabad Capital Territory. The CDA was established on 14 June 1960 by executive order entitled Pakistan Capital Regulation. As of 2016, most of CDA's municipal services and departments have been transferred to the newly created Islamabad Metropolitan Corporation, although CDA is still in charge of estate management, project execution and sector developments.

History 

Yahya Khan was designated its first Chairman, when he was a Lieutenant General.

Responsibilities and services
 Act as Regulatory Authority
 Building Code Standards.
 Environment Standards.
 Public Safety Standards.
 Maintenance
 Local Roads Maintenance and Repair Work.
 Public Infrastructure Maintenance.
 Garbage Collection
 Developer and Planner
 Further expansion of Islamabad, Future planning
 Township

CDA Model School 
The Capital Development Authority developed the CDA Model School in Islamabad in 1970.

Controversies

Since 2014, the CDA has been targeting and demolishing illegal slums who are largely occupied by Christians in Islamabad. The Supreme Court put on hold the demolitions and ordered from the CDA a written justification to it. The CDA's replied that "Most of these katchi abadis [slums] are under the occupation of the Christian community." "It seems this pace of occupation of land by Christian community may increase. Removal of katchi abadies is very urgent to provide [a] better environment to the citizen[s] of Islamabad and to protect the beauty of Islamabad." Various human rights activists condemned the response.

See also 
 Cabinet Secretariat Department
 Model Town Humak
 CDA Model School
 Developments in Islamabad

References

External links 
 CDA Official Website

Pakistan federal departments and agencies
Government of Islamabad
1960 establishments in Pakistan
Public benefit corporations
Urban development authorities